Sophora toromiro, commonly known as toromiro, is a species of flowering tree in the legume family, Fabaceae, that is endemic to Easter Island.

History
Heavy deforestation had eliminated most of the island's forests by the first half of the 17th century, and the once common toromiro became rare and ultimately extinct in the wild in the 1960s. Local tradition has it that the rongorongo tablets of Easter Island are made of toromiro. However, all tablets of native wood tested by modern methods have turned out to be Thespesia populnea, known as miro or milo in some Polynesian languages. David Attenborough describes the timber from which a small wooden male sculpture in his possession is made, having been identified by Kew Gardens as Sophora toromiro.

Conservation
The tree is being reintroduced to the island in a scientific project partly led jointly by the Royal Botanic Gardens, Kew and the Gothenburg Botanical Garden, where the only remaining plants of this species with a documented origin were propagated in the 1960s from seeds collected from a single tree by Thor Heyerdahl. It is sometimes claimed that all toromiro trees are derived from this single individual, but research has determined that at least one other tree's descendants survive.

The Jardin du Val Rahmeh, a botanical garden in Menton in the south of France, is dedicated to the acclimatization and conservation of rare species, including Sophora toromiro.

References

 Maunder, M et al. (2000): Conservation of the Toromiro Tree: Case Study in the Management of a Plant Extinct in the Wild. Conservation Biology 14(5): 1341–1350.

External links 
 
 
 Toromiro tree, Sophora toromiro Kew Botanic Gardens
 Image of toromiro flowers
 Portal del Plan Nacional de Conservación del Toromiro - CONAF Isla de Pascua

toromiro
Flora of Easter Island
Trees of the Pacific